Waldburg-Waldsee was a County and later Principality within Holy Roman Empire, ruled by the House of Waldburg, located in southeastern Baden-Württemberg, Germany, around Bad Waldsee.

Waldburg-Waldsee was a partition of Waldburg-Wolfegg. When the Wolfegg branch extinguished in 1798, the Waldsee branch inherited Wolfegg. Waldburg-Waldsee was a county prior to 1803, when it was raised to a principality shortly before being mediatised to Württemberg in 1806.  The castle of the princes of Waldburg-Waldsee lies in the town of Kißlegg.

Rulers of Waldburg-Waldsee 
The Waldburg-Waldsee are one of five branches of the Waldburg family, the others being Waldburg-Waldburg, Walsdburg-Zei, Waldburg-Wolfeck, and Waldburg-Wurzach.  By 1872, Waldburg, Wolfeck, and Waldsee merged into a single Waldburg-Waldsee branch.  Zeil and Wurzach merged into a second branch.

Counts of Waldburg-Waldsee (1667–1803) 
 John (1667–1724)
 Maximilian (1724–48) 
 Francis Joseph (1724–29)
 Gebhard John (1748–90)
 Joseph Anthony (1790–1803)

Prince of Waldburg-Wolfegg-Waldsee (1803–06) 
 Joseph Anthony (1803–06)

Princes of Waldburg-Wolfegg-Waldsee (mediatized) 

  Joseph Anthony, 1st Prince 1803-1833 (1766-1833)
  Friedrich, 2nd Prince 1833-1871 (1808-1871)
  Franz, 3rd Prince 1871-1906 (1833-1906)
  Maximilian, 4th Prince 1906-1950 (1863-1950)
  Franz Ludwig, 5th Prince 1950-1989 (1892-1989)
  Max Willibald, 6th Prince 1989-1998 (1924-1998)
  Johannes, 7th Prince since 1998 (b.1957)
 Ludwig, Hereditary Prince of Waldburg-Wolfegg and Waldsee (b.1990)
  Count Leonardo (b.1995)

References

Further reading 
 Marquis of Ruvigny, The Titled Nobility of Europe, London: Harrison & Sons, 1914, reprinted by Burke's Peerage, 1980 .

1667 establishments in the Holy Roman Empire